Correspondence chess is chess played by various forms of long-distance correspondence, traditionally through the postal system. Today it is usually played through a correspondence chess server, a public internet chess forum, or email. Less common methods that have been employed include fax, homing pigeon and phone.

Correspondence chess allows people or clubs who are geographically distant to play one another without meeting in person. These distant relationships are just one of the many distinct appeals of correspondence chess. The length of a game played by correspondence can vary depending on the method used to transmit moves: a game played via server or by email might last no more than a few days, weeks, or months; a game played by post between players in different countries might last several years.

Structure 
Correspondence chess differs from over-the-board (OTB) play in several respects. While players in OTB chess generally play one game at a time (an exception being a simultaneous exhibition), correspondence players often have several games going at once. Tournament games are played concurrently, and some players may have more than one hundred games continuing at the same time.

Time limits in correspondence play are usually between 30 and 60 days for every 10 moves (plus transmission time in postal chess). This time allows for far deeper calculation, meaning that blunders can be less frequent. Certain forms of assistance, including books, chess databases and sometimes chess programs, are often allowed. Books and databases are almost universally acceptable, but organizations vary as to whether chess engine use is permitted.

Computer assistance 
The phenomenon of computer assistance has altered the essence of correspondence chess. In addition to profound chess knowledge and analytical discipline, the ability to interpret and guide computer analysis has also become important. Given that even players with poor chess knowledge can use the strongest computer programs to analyse their games, the gap between the beginner and master player has narrowed in recent years. However, the influence of computer assistance remains controversial in both official and casual play, and consensus on the issue of whether to allow computer aid is still lacking.

Variant chess games are often played on public chess servers or chess forums. Since the games are a modified form, chess engines may be less helpful, or based on the variant, completely useless. For example, chess games played on an unbounded chessboard, or infinite chess, are virtually untouched by chess-playing software.

Regulatory bodies 

Correspondence chess tournaments are usually played under the auspices of an official regulatory body, most importantly the International Correspondence Chess Federation (ICCF), which is affiliated with FIDE, the international chess organization. However, the ICCF, which organizes postal and email events, is not the only organization involved in correspondence chess. There are numerous national and regional bodies for postal chess, as well as a number of organisations devoted to organizing email play for free such as the International Email Chess Group (IECG), Lechenicher SchachServer (LSS), and the Free Internet Correspondence Games Server (FICGS), that also run a world championship cycle, and International E-mail Chess Club (IECC). However, groups other than the ICCF are not sanctioned by FIDE.

The ICCF awards the titles International Master, Senior International Master and International Correspondence Chess Grandmaster—these are equivalent to similar titles awarded by FIDE for over-the-board chess. The ICCF also runs the World Correspondence Chess Championships. Because these events can last a long time, they may overlap: for instance, in February 2005 Joop van Oosterom was declared winner of the eighteenth Championship (which began in June 2003), though the winner of the seventeenth Championship (which began in March 2002) had not yet been determined.

Up until 2004, ICCF correspondence chess was played only via email and postal mail. For playing by these two forms of transmission, the ICCF sanctioned the use of ICCF numeric notation, sometimes known as Koch notation. However, if players agreed to use a mutually agreeable notation system, this was accepted.

In recent years, the use of increasingly powerful chess programs has brought forth new challenges for organizations like the ICCF and the U.S. Chess Federation, necessitating sometimes controversial decisions on the admissibility of such programs in official correspondence play.

Moreover, the emergence of the Internet has brought new opportunities for correspondence chess, not all of which are organized by official bodies. Casual correspondence chess includes correspondence play initiated through correspondence chess servers and games played between individuals who meet and play on their own. Casual correspondence play does not lead to official ratings, though some chess servers will calculate ratings for the players based on results on that server.

Types 
There are several types of correspondence chess, with server-based correspondence chess becoming the most popular form in the world today, with major 
correspondence servers becoming as large and popular as the online blitz chess servers.

Server-based correspondence chess 

Correspondence chess servers are usually database-driven and carry with them a web-based interface for submitting moves to the database. But they do create the possibility of facilitating any method of transmission, as long as the transmitted moves are audited within the server's database.

Server fees vary. Most casual servers use a yearly charging model, whereby players can play as many tournaments or games as they want all year round. Some servers offer basic membership for free, with more services available for a fee. Also more casual servers allow the use of nicknames, and have a real-time rating system which often adjusts a player's rating after each rated game. Casual servers also tend to have a wide range of facilities, such as online games databases, social and chess improvement forums, teams, and player homepages. More traditional correspondence chess servers often charge per tournament and force the use of real names. For example, competitors in the Correspondence Chess League of America use their real names rather than aliases.

Mobile correspondence chess 
With the advent of smartphones such as Apple's iPhone, Blackberry, and Android-based devices, correspondence chess has seen a recent rise in popularity as applications on these devices. Usually the devices use wireless internet or SMS technology to submit their moves to a central server.

Email-based correspondence chess 
There are organizations devoted to organizing play by email, such as the International E-mail Chess Club (IECC).

Email play has gradually declined in popularity due to issues such as email viruses, opponents' claims of not receiving moves, and similar impediments to the point email play has arguably been superseded by server-based correspondence chess, where usually the interface to a chess server is a web-based interface.

Postal (traditional mail) correspondence chess 
There are national and regional organizations for postal chess which use traditional "snail mail" for transmitting moves between players. The ICCF and affiliated local and national federations often organize postal events. Other examples of groups offering postal play include the Correspondence Chess League of America (CCLA) and the United States Chess Federation (USCF). However, groups other than the ICCF and affiliates are not sanctioned by FIDE.

Traditional postal chess organizations such as the International Correspondence Chess Federation, the Correspondence Chess League of America (CCLA), and the United States Chess Federation (USCF) have added email and/or server-based options to their correspondence play.

One of the older documented postal correspondence chess games is a game played in 1804 by lieutenant-colonel F.W. von Mauvillon of the Dutch army in The Hague with one of his officers in Breda.

Postal correspondence chess has arguably been superseded by server-based correspondence chess.

Over-the-board players who also play correspondence chess 
Although nowadays the strongest correspondence players are specialists, a number of notable players in over-the-board (OTB) chess have in the past played postal games during their chess career.

Paul Keres, an Estonian sometimes regarded as the strongest player never to become world champion, played many games of correspondence chess. OTB world champions Alexander Alekhine and Max Euwe also played. Ulf Andersson also achieved very high ratings in both ICCF and FIDE, remaining in the FIDE top 100 until June 2002 and consistently ranked second on ICCF. Andrei Sokolov is another OTB GM who has recently taken up email chess. World Correspondence Champion Hans Berliner was also an OTB International Master.

In 1999, Garry Kasparov played a chess game "Kasparov versus the World" over the Internet, hosted by the MSN Gaming Zone. The "World Team" included participation of over 50,000 people from more than 75 countries, deciding their moves by plurality vote. The game lasted four months, with Kasparov playing "g7" on his 62nd move and announcing a forced checkmate in 28 moves. The World Team voters resigned on October 22. After the game Kasparov said "It is the greatest game in the history of chess. The sheer number of ideas, the complexity, and the contribution it has made to chess make it the most important game ever played."

See also 
Correspondence Chess Olympiad
ICCF national member federations
International Correspondence Chess Grandmaster
Internet chess servers
Kasparov versus the World – a game played in 1999 between Garry Kasparov and over 50,000 participants from over 75 countries
World Correspondence Chess Championship
Online chess

References

Further reading

External links

IECC International E-mail Chess Club
ICCF International Correspondence Chess Federation 
FICGS Free Internet Correspondence Games Server 
IECG International Email Chess Group
CCLA Correspondence Chess League of America
CCN Archives Correspondence Chess News

 
Play-by-mail games